Haselor is a village in Warwickshire.  It is by the River Alne, about one mile east of Alcester just off the A46 main road to Stratford-upon-Avon. The parish church is remote from the present houses, the old village having been demolished after a plague epidemic.

History
The present day Haselor parish church was formed from the amalgamation of the parishes of Upton and Haselor. Both these have ancient manors dating back to the Domesday Book.  The longest tenure of Haselor manor was by St Mary's College, Warwick, from 1395 to about 1530. A selection of early photographs of Haselor, Upton, and also the neighbouring village of Walcote, is available on the website Haselor & Walcote Local History from Walcote Farm. This has other local history information, including a list of the farms in Haselor Parish in 1767.

Parish Church
St Mary and All Saints Church is located on a hill and accessed by two footpaths, each of about a quarter-mile, on opposite sides. One of the longest serving Vicars was Rev. John Heath Sykes. In March 1914 many parishioners subscribed towards a Bible and a sun dial as a memorial of his work as Vicar. The clock on the church tower was paid for by public subscription as a war memorial in thanksgiving for the end of the First World War.  Tablets inside the porch form one public record of those who died in the two world wars. Additional Rolls of Honour, of which one was found more recently folded inside a bible are on display inside the church.

School
The village has a primary school that is a part of the Tudor grange trust ranging from nursery to Year 6. The village has a foundation school, taking children aged 4 to 11. In 2003, 11 pupils were assessed at Key Stages 1 and 2, with the school being ranked 16 out of 151 in Warwickshire.

Gallery

References

External links

Haselor & Walcote Local History from Walcote Farm.
Haselor on St Nicholas Alcester website
BBC News report on Haselor School in league tables for 2003
Haselor W.I. page on Warwickshire County Council list of external organisations

Villages in Warwickshire